City Lights Align is the first solo album by Canadian musician Wayne Petti, released 13 March 2007. The album was released by Outside Music.

Track listing
"Falling Behind" – 1:32
"Moment by Moment" – 2:46
"Here Is My Heart" – 2:17
"Price To Pay" – 2:40
"I'll Be With You" – 2:20
"I Wait" – 2:50
"The Only Only One" – 3:29 – Written by J. Dragonetti
"Up on the Hillside" – 3:29
"Lost Without You" – 3:16
"All of the Time" – 2:25
"Night Sky" – 2:27

Personnel
Wayne Petti – All songs
Paul Aucoin – recording
Noah Mintz – mastering 
Stewart Jones – artwork
Alex Durlak – Layout

References

2007 debut albums
Wayne Petti albums
Outside Music albums